Homogeneous Serbia is a written discourse by Stevan Moljević. In this work, contrary to the presumptions of Ilija Garašanin who believed that the strength of the state is derived from its size and organizational principles, Moljević emphasized that the state drew its strength from the degree to which its population identifies itself within the state. Moljević believed that the victorious Kingdom of Serbia in 1918 made a grave mistake when it decided to establish Yugoslavia instead of clearly defining the borders of Serbia.

Right after the collapse of Yugoslavia during the short April war, Moljević created the concept of "homogeneous" Serbia and trialist Yugoslavia. The map presented in this work awards territory of northern Dalmatia with substantial Serb population to Croatia.

Moljević wrote another treatise titled An Opinion About Our State and Its Borders, which he presented to Dragiša Vasić along with Homogeneous Serbia.

John R. Lampe pointed to significant details such as that the Central National Committee had secondary status while Moljević did not rise to prominence in this committee until 1943, undercutting the perception about Moljević's Homogeneous Serbia being the centerpiece of a coherent set of Chetnik war objectives. There is no proof that massacres of Muslims committed by Chetniks were a direct consequence of Moljević's tract, bearing in mind the fragmented and very weak command structure of Mihailović which militated against any systematic annihilation programme.

References

Sources 

 
 
 
 
 
 

1941 documents
1941 in Yugoslavia
Serbian nationalism